Troy station could refer to:

 Troy Transit Center, a train and bus station in Troy, Michigan
 Union Station (Troy, New York), a former train station in Troy, New York